Norberto "Beto" Quintanilla Iracheta (May 23, 1948 – March 18, 2007) was a Regional Mexican singer and songwriter. He was known as "El Mero León del Corrido" (The Lion of the Corrido).

Biography 
Beto Quintanilla was originally from General Terán, a small town in Nuevo León. The date of his birth is unknown, but was some time around 1948. As a child, Quintanilla composed poems or odes to his mother, his teacher, his school, and his country. He left school after only a year of secondary education in order to work in fields alongside his father and his five brothers. His extended family also included three male relatives and two women. The farm was not enough to support the entire family and when he was 13 years old, young Beto relocated to Reynosa, Tamaulipas, where he had found a job milking cows. He did this for a year, and then worked with an aunt in a clothing store for several years.

Quintanilla never had any formal musical training. Although he had always written poetry and songs, musical instruments and musical training were scarce, and he knew few musicians. However, at some time during his life on the ranch, he did meet a pair of musicians who played bajo sexto and accordion. He began writing songs for them, and then songs for other groups. Eventually he came to the attention of Ruben Polanco, the artistic director of a record company, and Polanco encouraged him to sing his songs himself. Apparently Quintanilla initially objected that he did not know how to sing and felt out of place when he sang. Polanco told him not to waste time [with excuses], that he (Polanco) wanted to sign artists like Quintanilla, and that he (Quintanilla) had a unique style and presence.

Quintanilla died in Reynosa on March 18, 2007. The cause of death was a heart attack, said to be related to a drug overdose.

Legacy 
Quintanilla recorded mostly narcocorridos, many of which he composed. He recorded more than 20 albums in his lifetime, not including collections of hits. After his death, many of his albums were re-released, and his songs appeared on various collections released by different record companies. Some of these collections have misleading titles: for instance, the album "La Ejecución De Juan" [English: "The Execution of Juan"], released in 2009, apparently does not contain the song "La Ejecución De Juan", which was on the original album, a concept album of the same title. (The album cover shown is another album entirely, making the matter more confusing.) Other posthumous releases or the publicity for them imply that the material on them is new, or even that Quintanilla is still alive. Quintanilla wrote and performed a substantial number of songs, well over 100, but due to all the album releases, some of his songs appear on two, three or four albums, making his discography much larger than the body of work behind it.

In 2006, Beto recorded an album with his look-alike and sound-alike brother, Jesus "Chuy" Quintanilla, called "Frente A Frente" [English: "Face to Face"]. Chuy Quintanilla carried on the family narcocorrido tradition until 2013, when he was murdered near Mission, Texas. Beto's son, Beto Quintanilla Jr., recorded an album of his father's songs, "Homenaje a Mi Padre" [English: "Respects To My Father"] in 2007, soon after his father died.

Beto Quintanilla's famous songs include "El Deportado", "Mi Ultimo Contrabando", "Le Compre La Muerte a Mi Hijo", "Raquenel Villanueva",
"El Gordo Paz", "El Sapo", "Los Pilares de la Carcel", "El Calabozo", "La Carga Ladeada", "Un Ratoncito Orejon", and "El Corrido de
Los Zetas." These songs remain concert and studio standards for bands that play corridos.

Discography 
La Carrera Del Chucho (unknown date)
La Ejecución De Juan (unknown date)
Los Primeros 15 Rugidos Del León (unknown date)
Más Corridos (unknown date)
Corridos Famosos y El Gordo Paz (2001) 
El Ratoncito Orejon (1997)
El Ondeao (1998)
Al Filo De La Navaja (2001)
Antonio Fonseca (2001)
En Vivo Desde Linares, Nuevo León (2001)
La Carga Del Diablo (2001)
Pistoleros De Fama (2001)
15 Éxitos de Beto Quintanilla (2002)
Pa' La Raza (2002)
Libertad de Expresión (2002)
Corridos A La Mexicana (2003)
15 Éxitos (2004)
16 Éxitos (2004)
Con Banda Suspiro (2004)
En Vivo (2004)
Gallo Fino (2004)
Mi Historia Musical: 20 Exitos (2004)
Pobreza Infeliz (2004)
Pa' Cantar Hay Que Ser Gallo (2004)
100% Corridos (with Lalo Mora) (2005)
25 Aniversario: En Concierto (2005)
25 Aniversario en Vivo y Directo (DVD) (2005)
Las Clásicas (2005)
Los Ángeles Van al Cielo (2004)
Mi Vida En Canciones—15 Exitos (with DVD) (2005)
Rafael Lucero (2005)
Todo Quintanilla (2005)
Abandone a Mi Amigo (2005)
Corridos Famosos y El Gordo Paz (2006)
Frente Al Frente (with Chuy Quintanilla) (2006)
20 Exitos (2006)
El Beso De Tierra (2007)
Las Claves de Beto Quintanilla  (2007)
Mi Hijo No Es Un Cobarde (2007)
Tragedias Reales de la Vida (2007)
Las Viejas Bravas De ... (2007)
Clasicas 15 Éxitos (2008)
El Mero León Del Corrido (2000)
El Pescado Enjabonado (2008)
Le Compré La Muerte A Mi Hijo (2003)
La Santisima Muerte (2008)
Los Primeros Rugidos Del León (2008)
Los Remixes Del Mero León Del Corrido (2008)
Mi Historia Musical—20 Corridos (2008)
Patrulla de Blanco y Negro (2008)
Raquenel Villanueva (2000)
Ratoncito Orejon (2008)
Trans-Am 98 (2008)
Con la Banda Yurirense (2008)
La Ejecución De Juan (2009)
Los Remixes Del Mero Leon Del Corrido, Vol. 2 (2011)
Mujeres Buenas Malas Y Valientes (2011)
El Mero León Del Corrido 2 (2012)
Para Toda La Leonada (2012)
Las Clásicas (2013)
Mis Primero Éxitos (2013)
Puros Corridos, Vol. 1 (2014)

References 

1948 births
2007 deaths
Singers from Nuevo León
20th-century Mexican male singers
21st-century Mexican male singers